Amor Amor (Our Love Songs) is a Portuguese telenovela which began airing on SIC on 4 January 2021 and ended on 5 June 2022.

Plot

Season 1 
Linda and Romeu have always been best friends – and singers in rival bands. 
When he turned 18, Linda declared her love, showing him a song she wrote about them.

The two got involved, but soon after Romeo went on tour with his father's band, and he was seduced by one of the singers - the sexy Vanessa.

Later, Linda decides to seek Romeu and after a fatal accident with Romeu's father, they decide to run away.

But the plan changes when Vanessa discovers she is pregnant of Romeu's father, with whom she was also involved with. Duly instructed by her mischievous sister, Angela, she reports Linda to the police.

Thinking she has been betrayed by Romeu, Linda goes to Luxembourg. While the heartbroken Romeu accepts Angela's proposal to become a great singer, if he marries Vanessa and takes the baby that Romeu believes to be his.

Months later, Linda attends one of Romeu's concerts, where he proposes to Vanessa and dedicates the song she wrote, when they were 18, as if it was written by him. That night in the exact same hospital, both Linda, who is pregnant with Romeu's child, and Vanessa go into labour. A failure on the hospital's electrical system will cause a swap of babies, and without knowing anything, Linda ends up raising the daughter of the woman who stole the great love of her life.

Twenty years will pass until Linda and Romeu cross paths again. He is now the king of Portuguese popular music and together with Ângela, his sister-in-law, they launch new singers into the music industry, including Romeu and Sandy, Vanessa's daughter. Coincidently, Sandy's partner will find the next musical prodigy, Linda's daughter – Melanie.

Romeu will invite Melanie for an audition, but Linda forbids her to attend it. When she realizes Melanie ran away to Portugal, Linda will come after her.

It is in Portugal, where everything started, that after seeing Romeu perform the song she wrote, Linda exposes him to the public.

Season 2 
Romeu and Linda are married and at the height of their success. She is now an established artist while he signed with a Spanish label to get into the Latin market. For this purpose, the label is filming a documentary on Rormeu’s life with plans to show it in cinemas worldwide.
Ângela, now reduced to being a petty merchant at local fairs, refuses to be left out of her ex brother-in-law’s story. Her, of all people, who made him a successful singer over twenty years ago. But luck seems to be on her side...
One day, while selling at the fair with Cajó, Ângela sees a familiar face among the crowd. Bela is a woman who, twenty years ago, Ângela paid to stop her pregnancy from Romeu’s baby. As she sees her now with Ricky by her side, a boy of around the same age as the child would be by now, Ângela quickly realizes that Bela didn’t go through with it at all and kept quiet about it during all these years. When confronted about it, Bela ends up admitting that Ricky really is Romeu’s son, which will turn into Ângela's biggest asset.

Cast

Main

Recurring

Guest cast

Telenovela overview

References
Notes

Citations

External links
 

2021 Portuguese television series debuts
2022 Portuguese television series endings
Portuguese telenovelas
2021 telenovelas
Sociedade Independente de Comunicação telenovelas
Portuguese-language telenovelas
Television shows set in Portugal